The Dandong–Dalian intercity railway is a high-speed line operated by China Railway High-speed within the Liaodong Peninsula of Liaoning province, connecting the coastal cities of Dandong and Dalian.

Overview
Dandong–Dalian intercity railway is broken down into three segments: Dandong–Zhuanghe, Zhuanghe–Dengshahe, and Dengshahe–Dalian. The construction period was estimated to take about three and a half years and was started on 17 March 2010. It started operation on 17 December 2015.

History

Planning phase
 21 April 2009 – Liaoning Provincial Government and the Ministry of Railways signed the "On the strengthening of Liaoning railway construction Minutes", which set a railway design speed of  along a double track line electrified railway for passengers and freight. 
 28 June 2009 – Ministry of Railways jointly with the provincial government reported to the National Development and Reform Commission about their studies on this project. 
 19–21 December 2009 – Ministry of Railways held preliminary design review meeting, formally adopting the project preliminary design review.

Construction phase
 17 March 2010 – Dandong – Zhuanghe section started. 
 2 December 2010 – First bridge girder erection in the Donggang, Liaoning, area, well north of the town of Wolong with several large bridges completed.

Operation phase
 17 December 2015 – Start operation.

References

High-speed railway lines in China
Rail transport in Liaoning
Standard gauge railways in China
Railway lines opened in 2015